The 1920 Washington gubernatorial election was held on November 2, 1920. Incumbent Republican Louis F. Hart defeated Farmer–Labor nominee Robert Bridges with 52.25% of the vote.

Primary elections
Primary elections were held on September 9, 1920.

Democratic primary

Candidates 
William Wilson Black
Edward T. Mathes
A.E. Judd
I.G. O'Harra

Results

Republican primary

Candidates
Louis F. Hart, incumbent Governor
Roland H. Hartley, former State Representative
George B. Lamping, State Senator
Edwin T. Coman
John Arthur Gellatly, State Senator
John Stringer
Anna MacEachern

Results

General election

Candidates
Major party candidates
Louis F. Hart, Republican 
William Wilson Black, Democratic

Other candidates
Robert Bridges, Farmer–Labor 
David Burgess, Socialist Labor

Results

References

1920
Washington
Gubernatorial